Baron Béla Wenckheim (Körösladány, 16 February 1811 – Budapest, 7 July 1879) was a Austro-Hungarian politician who served as Prime Minister of Hungary for several months in 1875.

Biography 
He was born into a rich Austro-Hungarian noble family which originated in Franconia, as the eldest son of Baron Joseph von Wengkheim (1778-1830) and his wife, Baroness Terézia Orczy de Orczi (1790-1875). He never married and didn't have children.

References 

1811 births
1879 deaths
People from Körösladány
Prime Ministers of Hungary
Hungarian nobility
Bela
Hungarian people of German descent
Hungarian Interior Ministers
Foreign ministers of Hungary
Members of the House of Magnates
Lord-lieutenants of a county in Hungarian Kingdom